The third constituency for French residents overseas (French: Troisième circonscription des Français établis hors de France) is one of eleven constituencies representing French citizens living abroad. It was created by the 2010 redistricting of French legislative constituencies and elects, since 2012, one representative to the National Assembly.

It represents all French citizens living in Northern Europe and the British Isles. As of 2022, it contained 168,869 registered French voters.

Area
It covers all French citizens living in ten countries in Northern Europe - specifically, Iceland, Norway, Denmark (including the Faroe Islands and Greenland), Sweden, Finland (including Åland), Ireland, the United Kingdom, Estonia, Latvia and Lithuania. As of New Year's Day 2011, it contained 140,731 registered French voters. By far the greatest number of these (113,655) were living in the United Kingdom, the country with the third greatest number of registered French residents in the world. (In contrast, there were only 146 in Estonia, and just one in Greenland.)

This constituency elected its first ever representative at the 2012 French legislative election.

Deputies

National Assembly elections

2022 

 
 
 
 
|-
| colspan="8" bgcolor="#E9E9E9"|
|-

2017

Candidates
The list of candidates was officially finalised on 15 May. There are 16 candidates, 10 women and 6 men:

The En Marche! Party chose Alexandre HOLROYD, a resident of London, as its candidate. His deputy (suppléant) is Laure PHILIPPON MAILLARD, also a resident of London.

The Socialist Party chose Axelle LEMAIRE, a resident of London, as its candidate. Her deputy (suppléant) is Matthieu PINARD.

The Republicans Party chose Laurence AZZENA- GOUGEON as its candidate. Her deputy (suppléant) is Philippe CHALON.

The France Insoumise Party chose Olivier TONNEAU as its candidate. His deputy (suppléant) is Anne PHILIPPE.

The National Front chose Tony Thommes. Xavier Rollin was his deputy.

Campaign
The elections will take place on:
 4 June for the first round
 18 June for the second round

This year there was no electronic vote available due to cyber threats.

The campaign officially started on 23 May.

6 of the candidates held a debate organised and hosted by Le Petit Journal at King's College in London on 23 May 2017.

The next debate will take place on 13 June between the 2 candidates qualified for the second round.

Results

|- style="background:#e9e9e9; text-align:center;"
! colspan="2" rowspan="2" style="text-align:left;" | Candidate
! rowspan="2" colspan="2" style="text-align:left;" | Party
! colspan="2" | 1st round
! colspan="2" | 2nd round
|- style="background:#e9e9e9; text-align:center;"
! style="width:75px;"| Votes
! style="width:30px;"| %
! style="width:75px;"| Votes
! style="width:30px;"| %
|-
| style="background-color:" |
| style="text-align:left;" | Alexandre Holroyd
| style="text-align:left;" | La Republique En Marche!
| REM
| 
| 57.80%
| 
| 70.11%
|-
| style="background-color:" |
| style="text-align:left;" | Axelle Lemaire
| style="text-align:left;" | Socialist Party
| PS
| 
| 9.83%
| 
| 29.89%
|-
| style="background-color:" |
| style="text-align:left;" | Laurence Azzena-Gougeon
| style="text-align:left;" | The Republicans
| LR
| 
| 8.82%
| colspan="2" rowspan="14" style="background:#e9e9e9;"|
|-
| style="background-color:" |
| style="text-align:left;" | Olivier Tonneau
| style="text-align:left;" | La France insoumise
| FI
| 
| 7.19%
|-
| style="background-color:" |
| style="text-align:left;" | Patricia Connell
| style="text-align:left;" | Union of Democrats and Independents
| UDI
| 
| 5.49%
|-
| style="background-color:" |
| style="text-align:left;" | Karine Daudicourt
| style="text-align:left;" | Europe Ecology – The Greens
| EELV
| 
| 5.46%
|-
| style="background-color:" |
| style="text-align:left;" | Tony Thommes
| style="text-align:left;" | National Front
| FN
| 
| 1.49%
|-
| style="background-color:" |
| style="text-align:left;" | Béatrice Pauly
| style="text-align:left;" | Christian Democratic Party
| PCD
| 
| 0.91%
|-
| style="background:#0b7d86;"|
| style="text-align:left;"| Pierre-Alexandre Greil
| style="text-align:left;"| Popular Republican Union
| UPR
| 
| 0.79%
|-
| style="background-color:" |
| style="text-align:left;" | Olivier Bitterlin
| style="text-align:left;" | Independent Ecological Movement
| MEI
| 
| 0.77%
|-
| style="background-color:" |
| style="text-align:left;"| Marine Roussillon
| style="text-align:left;"| Communist Party
| PCF
| 
| 0.48%
|-
| style="background-color:" |
| style="text-align:left;"| Cindy Demichel
| colspan="2" style="text-align:left;"| #MyVoice
| 
| 0.37%
|-
| style="background-color:" |
| style="text-align:left;"| Véronique Vermorel
| style="text-align:left;"| Pirate Party
| PP
| 
| 0.31%
|-
| style="background-color:" |
| style="text-align:left;"| Palmira Pozo
| style="text-align:left;"| Front of Republican Patriots
| RPF
| 
| 0.27%
|-
| style="background:indigo;"|
| style="text-align:left;"| Florence Sarlat
| style="text-align:left;"| Animalist Party
| PA
| 
| 0.03%
|-
| style="background-color:" |
| style="text-align:left;" | Thierry Rignol
| style="text-align:left;" | Miscellaneous right
| DVD
| 
| 0.01%
|-
| colspan="8" style="background:#e9e9e9;"|
|- style="font-weight:bold"
| colspan="4" style="text-align:left;" | Total
| 
| 100%
| 
| 100%
|-
| colspan="8" style="background:#e9e9e9;"|
|-
| colspan="4" style="text-align:left;" | Registered voters
| 
| style="background:#e9e9e9;"|
| 
| style="background:#e9e9e9;"|
|-
| colspan="4" style="text-align:left;" | Blank ballots
| 
| 0.17%
| 
| 2.01%
|-
| colspan="4" style="text-align:left;" | Null ballots
| 
| 0.32%
| 
| 0.60%
|-
| colspan="4" style="text-align:left;" | Turnout
| 
| 21.12%
| 
| 17.54%
|-
| colspan="4" style="text-align:left;" | Abstentions
| 
| 78.88%
| 
| 82.46%
|}

2012

Candidates
The list of candidates was officially finalised on 14 May. There were twenty candidates:

The Socialist Party chose Axelle Lemaire, a resident of London, as its candidate. Her deputy (suppléant) was Christophe Premat, a resident of Stockholm.

The Union for a Popular Movement chose Emmanuelle Savarit, with Geoffrey Party as her deputy (suppléant).

The Left Front chose Lucile Jamet, with Sébastien Mas as her deputy (suppléant).

The Democratic Movement chose Yannick Naud as its candidate. Marianne Magnin was his deputy (suppléante).

Europe Écologie–The Greens chose Olivier Bertin. A resident of London, Bertin ran a bilingual preschool. He was also a member of the Green Party of England and Wales. Natacha Blisson was his deputy (suppléante).

The National Front chose Guy Le Guezennec. Gérard Berardi was his deputy.

The centre-right Radical Party and the centrist Republican, Ecologist and Social Alliance jointly chose Olivier de Chazeaux as their candidate, with Nathalie Chassaigne-Rombaut as his deputy.

The Radical Party of the Left chose Ezella Sahraoui. Alain Malcolm Douet was her deputy.

The Christian Democratic Party chose Denys Dhiver as its candidate. Dhiver, who was a member of the Union for a Popular Movement as well as of the CDP, was also endorsed by France Ecologie. Jorice Samuel is his deputy.

The Centrist Alliance chose Olivier Cadic, with Sophie Routier as his deputy.

Solidarity and Progress, the French branch of the LaRouche movement, was represented by Édith Tixier, with Yannick Caroff as her deputy.

Will Mael Nyamat stood as an independent candidate (miscellaneous left). A former member of the French Socialist Party, he left it and became a member of the British Labour Party. He was a resident of London. Dja-Tsingue Nzigou is his deputy.

Christophe Schermesser, who has lived and worked in Ireland, England and Finland, was the candidate of the European Federalist Party. Danielle Schermesser was his deputy.

Gaspard Koenig, a resident of London, was the candidate for the small French Liberal Democratic Party (which espouses economic liberalism). (It bears no relation to the British party of the same name.) Olivia Penichou is his deputy.

Marie-Claire Sparrow was the candidate of the Gathering of French Residents Overseas (Rassemblement des Français de l'étranger), related to the Union for a Popular Movement. Richard Dimosi was her deputy.

Aberzack Boulariah, an "expatriate entrepreneur", was an independent candidate. Marc Ambroise was his deputy.

Jérôme de Lavenère Lussan was a legal entrepreneur running as an independent candidate. Fahd Rachidi was his deputy.

The other independent candidates were: Bernard Larmoyer (with Virginie Charles as his deputy); Anne-Marie Wolfsohn (with Maïlys Michot-Casbas as her deputy); and Patrick Kaboza (with David Judaique as his deputy).

Campaign
Although campaigning was difficult due to the sheer size of the constituency, some candidates did travel to several countries to talk to expatriates. In addition, a debate over two evenings was organised at King's College, London in late May by Le Club Démocrate (UK), with many of the candidates taking part. A number of candidates were also interviewed (separately) on French Radio London.

A major issue for voters was reportedly the cost and accessibility of French schools abroad.

With a large majority of voters living in the UK, and twelve of the twenty candidates based there (including nine in London), the UK was a focal point of the campaign.

Results
As in other constituencies, turnout was low in the first round. Latvia was the only country in this constituency in which over half of registered French residents voted (57.3%). Turnout was also comparatively high in Estonia (41.1%) and Lithuania (41.0%). It was lowest in the United Kingdom (18.8%) and Ireland (21.8%). Nonetheless, French residents in the United Kingdom cast 72.53% of all ballots cast in this constituency.

Socialist candidate Axelle Lemaire won the first round vote by a clear margin. She finished first in every country except Estonia. Lemaire went on to win the second round by a large margin. When Lemaire was appointed Digital Affairs Minister in April 2014, her seat was taken by Christophe Premat.

Presidential elections

2017

|- style="background:#e9e9e9; text-align:center;"
! colspan="2" rowspan="2" style="text-align:left;" | Candidate
! rowspan="2" colspan="2" style="text-align:left;" | Party
! colspan="2" | 1st round
! colspan="2" | 2nd round
|- style="background:#e9e9e9; text-align:center;"
! style="width:75px;"| Votes
! style="width:30px;"| %
! style="width:75px;"| Votes
! style="width:30px;"| %
|-
| style="background-color:" |
| style="text-align:left;" | Emmanuel Macron
| style="text-align:left;" | En Marche!
| EM
| 
| 50.27%
| 
| 94.73%
|-
| style="background-color:" |
| style="text-align:left;" | François Fillon
| style="text-align:left;" | The Republicans
| LR
| 
| 22.04%
| colspan="2" rowspan="3" style="background:#e9e9e9;"|
|-
| style="background-color:" |
| style="text-align:left;" | Jean-Luc Mélenchon
| style="text-align:left;" | La France insoumise
| FI
| 
| 13.41%
|-
| style="background-color:" |
| style="text-align:left;" | Benoît Hamon
| style="text-align:left;" | Socialist Party
| PS
| 
| 7.72%
|-
| style="background-color:" |
| style="text-align:left;" | Marine Le Pen
| style="text-align:left;" | National Front
| FN
| 
| 3.15%
| 
| 5.27%
|-
| style="background-color:" |
| style="text-align:left;" | Nicolas Dupont-Aignan
| style="text-align:left;" | Debout la France
| DLF
| 
| 1.36%
| colspan="2" rowspan="6" style="background:#e9e9e9;"|
|-
| style="background:#0b7d86;"|
| style="text-align:left;"| François Asselineau
| style="text-align:left;"| Popular Republican Union
| UPR
| 
| 0.81%
|-
| style="background-color:" |
| style="text-align:left;" | Philippe Poutou
| style="text-align:left;" | New Anticapitalist Party
| NPA
| 
| 0.54%
|-
| style="background:#ffa54c;"|
| style="text-align:left;"| Jean Lassalle
| colspan="2" style="text-align:left;"| Résistons!
| 
| 0.33%
|-
| style="background-color:" |
| style="text-align:left;" | Nathalie Arthaud
| style="text-align:left;" | Lutte Ouvrière
| LO
| 
| 0.22%
|-
| style="background-color:" |
| style="text-align:left;"| Jacques Cheminade
| style="text-align:left;"| Solidarity and Progress
| S&P
| 
| 0.16%
|-
| colspan="8" style="background:#e9e9e9;"|
|- style="font-weight:bold"
| colspan="4" style="text-align:left;" | Total
| 
| 100%
| 
| 100%
|}

References

3
France–United Kingdom relations